Pseudopediastrum is a genus of green algae in the family Hydrodictyaceae.

References

External links

Sphaeropleales genera
Sphaeropleales